Paul Robinson (born 1959), is an English artist and painter, whose work is included in public, corporate and private collections worldwide.

He was born in Penrith, Cumbria, and studied Fine Art at Carlisle College of Art. After moving to London he found he was in demand as an illustrator, and he worked for many publications including The Sunday Times, Radio Times and Time Out magazine.
 
Eventually moving away from the world of commissioned work, Robinson turned to oils, developing a distinctive, textured style of working, inspired by a fascination with London subjects and architecture.

Having moved to Norfolk in 1999, he discovered new worlds to explore; from the contrast of the City with its high rise office blocks to the Norfolk landscape and its immeasurable expanse of sea and sky.

He has spoken of using the subjects on his door-step to fuel his imagination; resulting in an ongoing series of paintings which include ladies with stick thin legs, walking their reluctant dogs in the wind, rain and snow, romantic interludes and bustling towns created from his imagination, based on his familiar childhood surroundings, as well as the little towns dotted along the North Norfolk coast. Often set against the backdrop of the stormy North Sea and the rugged landscape of Cumbria, each work is accompanied by often humorous and quirky titles to illustrate the story behind each painting.

Paul Robinson's exhibitions at British Art Galleries include the  BRIAN SINFIELD GALLERY, ISLAND FINE ARTS, (ONE MAN SHOW), and THE GARDEN HOUSE GALLERY.

References

External links
 Paul Robinson Website

1959 births
Living people
English contemporary artists
20th-century English painters
English male painters
21st-century English painters
Young British Artists
20th-century English male artists
21st-century English male artists